Gopalganj Sadar is an upazila of Gopalganj District in the Division of Dhaka, Bangladesh.

History
Gopalganj sadar is the main town of Gopalgonj District. 15 MPs are from there. It has 15 banks,  including 3 commercial banks .It may take 2 or 3 hours to reach by road from Rajdhani after build the padma bridge (depending on traffic).  After the Liberation War Gopalgonj Sadar become 'Pourashava'. As a close fellow of Bangabandhu Sheikh Mujibur Rahman Panna Biswas of Gimadanga was selected as first Chairman. Khan Saheb Sheikh Mosharrof Hossain, Molla Jalaluddin Ahmed, Hemaet Uddin, Wahiduzzaman, Fayekuzzaman are well known figures among the others born in Sadar upozila.
Gopalgonj (town) consists of 21 wards and 72 mahallas. The area of the town is 46.88 km2. The town has a population of 85, 398; male 51.07%, female 46.93%. The density of population is 6874 per km2. The literacy rate among the town people is 75.1%.

Geography
It has 51, 630 households and a total area of 391.35 km2.

Demographics
According to the 1991 Bangladesh census, Gopalganj Sadar had a population of 291,409. Males constituted 50.73% of the population, and females 49.27%. The population aged 18 or over was 141,978. Gopalganj Sadar had an average literacy rate of 44.7% (7+ years), against the national average of 32.4%.

It has 57 schools, 13 colleges, and 2 university colleges.

Places of interest
 Ulpur has a former Zamindar palace which is known as "Ulpur Zamindar Bari". Now a part of that palace currently used as Tehsil Office.  
 Arpara also has a former Zamindar Palace which is known as "Arpara Zamindar Bari". One of the oldest historical Mosque "Munshi Bari Jame Mosjid" is also situated in Arpara village under Verarhat. There also have a tourist attraction and picnic spot called "Arpara Park". This is one of the most beautiful botanical garden in the entire district.

Administration
Gopalganj Sadar Upazila is divided into Gopalganj Municipality and 21 union parishads: Borasi, Baultali, Chandra Dighalia, Durgapur, Gobra, Gopinathpur, Haridaspur, Jalalabad, Kajulia, Karpara, Kati, Latifpur, Majhigati, Nizra, Paikkandi, Raghunathpur, Sahapur, Satpar, Suktail, Ulpur, and Upafi. The union parishads are subdivided into 127 mauzas and 197 villages.

Gopalganj Municipality is subdivided into 9 wards and 47 mahallas.

Education

There are ten colleges in the upazila: Government Bangabandhu College, Gopalgonj, Dr. Dilawar Husain Memorial College, Government Nazrul Degree College Satpar, Haji Lalmia City College, Kazi Zahural Huq College, Krishnapur Shaptodas Palli College, M. H. Khan Degree College, N. Haque College of Business & Technology, Sabira - Rouf College, and Sheikh Fazilatunnesa Government Women's College.

There also have some famous higher secondary school. They are: S. M. Model Government High School, Swarnakali High School, Arpara Islamia High School, Ulpur PC High School (1900), Boutali Sahapur Sammilani High School, founded in 1928, Chandra Dighalia High School, Gopinathpur High School (1911) are notable secondary schools.

See also
 Upazilas of Bangladesh
 Districts of Bangladesh
 Divisions of Bangladesh

References

Upazilas of Gopalganj District, Bangladesh